Elysées Condominiums is a 529 ft (161m) tall skyscraper in Chicago, Illinois. It was built from 1971 to 1972 and has 56 floors. Solomon, Cordwell, Buenz and Associates designed the building, which is the 69th tallest in Chicago.

See also
List of tallest buildings in Chicago
111 East Chestnut Condo Neighbor Blog

References
Skyscraperpage
Emporis

Residential skyscrapers in Chicago
Residential buildings completed in 1972
Residential condominiums in Chicago
1972 establishments in Illinois
Streeterville, Chicago